214 may refer to:

 214 (number), the number
 214, the year CE
 214 BC, the year BCE
 Area codes 214, 469, and 972, one of the telephone area codes of Dallas, Texas
 Type 214 submarine, or 214-class South Korean submarine
Asiana Airlines Flight 214, an aircraft accident at San Francisco International Airport

Music
 214 (song),  a 1994 song by Filipino band Rivermaya.